Lautaro Tomas López (born 8 January 1999) is an Argentine professional basketball player who last played for Borac Čačak of the Basketball League of Serbia and the ABA League.

Playing career 
In February 2018, López joined the Basketball Without Borders Global Camp in New Orleans, US.

López made his EuroLeague debut with Kirolbet Baskonia on 26 December 2019 in a 102–77 loss to Anadolu Efes, recording 2 assists in 3 minutes.

In May 2021, López signed a contract with Borac Čačak for the 2021 BLS playoffs. On 6 June, he signed a contract extension with Borac for the 2021–22 season.

National team career 
López was a member of the Argentina U16 national team that won the bronze medal at the 2015 FIBA Americas Under-16 Championship in Bahía Blanca, Argentina. Over five tournament games, he averaged 17.8 points, 3.8 rebounds, and 2.8 assists per game. He was a member of the Argentina U17 team that finished 13th at the 2016 FIBA Under-17 World Championship in Zaragoza, Spain. Over seven tournament games, he averaged team-high 17.1 points, 6.7 rebounds, and 2.7 assists per game. López was a member of the Argentina U18 team that finished 5th at the 2016 FIBA Americas Under-18 Championship in Valdivia, Chile. Over five tournament games, he averaged 6.6 points, 2.4 rebounds, and 2.8 assists per game. He was a member of the Argentina U19 national team that finished 8th at the 2017 FIBA Under-19 Basketball World Cup in Cairo, Egypt. Over seven tournament games, he averaged 7.6 points, 4.3 rebounds, and 3.3 assists per game.

References

External links 
 Player Profile at eurobasket.com
 Player Profile at realgm.com
 Player Profile at proballers.com
 Player Profile at aba-liga.com

1999 births
Living people
ABA League players
Argentine expatriate basketball people in Serbia
Argentine expatriate basketball people in Spain
Argentine expatriate sportspeople in Slovakia
Argentine men's basketball players
Basketball League of Serbia players
BK Inter Bratislava players
KK Borac Čačak players
Expatriate basketball people in Serbia
People from Resistencia, Chaco
Point guards
San Lorenzo de Almagro (basketball) players
Saski Baskonia players
Sportspeople from Chaco Province